The Senda del Oso (Spanish: Bear's Path) is a  rail-trail, hiking and bicycle path running through Asturias in northern Spain, running approximately between Entragu and Santa Marina in the south to Trubia in the north, near Oviedo. Originally a mining rail line used until 1963, the Senda is now a tourist destination for the area, and was featured in a Rails to Trails article in 2010. The path goes through some of the last remaining brown bear habitat in Spain, and indeed, was partly inspired by a nearby bear conservation project.

References

Rail trails in Spain
Hiking trails in Spain
Cycling in Spain